Elie Bleu is a French manufacturer of humidors. The company was founded in 1976.

Notable models include Flor de Alba, Medaille, Vegas, and the Che Guevara.

References

Manufacturing companies of France